Metapenaeus is a genus of prawns, containing the following species:

Metapenaeus affinis (H. Milne-Edwards, 1837)
Metapenaeus alcocki M. J. George & Rao, 1968
Metapenaeus anchistus (de Man, 1920)
Metapenaeus arabicus Hassan, 1978
Metapenaeus barbata (De Haan, 1844)
Metapenaeus bennettae Racek & Dall, 1965
Metapenaeus brevicornis (H. Milne-Edwards, 1837)
Metapenaeus conjunctus Racek & Dall, 1965
Metapenaeus dalli Racek, 1957
Metapenaeus demani (Roux, 1921)
Metapenaeus dobsoni (Miers, 1878)
Metapenaeus eboracensis Dall, 1957
Metapenaeus elegans de Man, 1907
Metapenaeus endeavouri (Schmitt, 1926)
Metapenaeus ensis (De Haan, 1844)
Metapenaeus insolitus Racek & Dall, 1965
Metapenaeus intermedius (Kishinouye, 1900)
Metapenaeus joyneri (Miers, 1880)
Metapenaeus krishnatrii Silas & Muthu, 1976
Metapenaeus kutchensis P. C. George, M. J. George & Rao, 1963
Metapenaeus lysianassa (de Man, 1888)
Metapenaeus macleayi (Haswell, 1879)
Metapenaeus monoceros (Fabricius, 1798)
Metapenaeus motohi Shinomiya & Sakai, 2009
Metapenaeus moyebi (Kishinouye, 1896)
Metapenaeus papuensis Racek & Dall, 1965
Metapenaeus stebbingi Nobili, 1904
Metapenaeus suluensis Racek & Dall, 1965
Metapenaeus tenuipes Kubo, 1949

References

Penaeidae
Crustacean genera